The Iron Rail Book Collective ran a volunteer-run radical library and anarchist bookstore in New Orleans, Louisiana. The infoshop's main focus was a lending library featuring a wide selection of books on topics including anarchism and socialism, fiction, gardening and philosophy. The Iron Rail also sold records, zines, local CDs and some miscellany. Events held at the Iron Rail included workshops and art presentations. The Iron Rail also contained the Above Ground Zine Library with a selection of thousands of zines, some very rare. As of September 2017, their personal site and Facebook page have not been updated in since 2015 and 2016 respectively.

Locations 
The original address of Iron Rail was 511 Marigny Street from 2003 until 2011, in a building known as 'The Ark'. The entire building was evicted by the New Orleans Police Department in March 2011. This forced the temporary closure of Iron Rail and also the Plan-B New Orleans Community Bike Project and Hasbin Wilby’s Recycled Art Supplies. In a statement the collective said that "alleged code and permit violations" were the reasons for the immediate closure. Iron Rail argued that their affairs were in order and because they were a non-profit organisation the permits being requested were not needed.

The collective then moved to 503 Barracks Street until February 2014. After this time, pop-up versions of the bookstore occasionally appeared in various venues in New Orleans.

Bookstore
The Iron Rail featured a section of political and underground books for sale. Categories included feminism, anarchism, ecology and primitivism, prisons and police, Native American studies, labor struggles, globalization, capitalist exploitation and subcultures. There was also a selection of cheap used fiction.

The Above Ground Zine Library found a home at the Iron Rail after Hurricane Katrina destroyed the punk warehouse on Banks Street. Robb Roemershauser moved hundreds of rare zines and continued to maintain the collection at Iron Rail.

Library
The library contained an extensive collection of radical books on topics including feminism, anarchism, history, race relations, ecology, labor struggles, cultural studies, protest and activism as well as a wide array of other interesting topics like philosophy, art, language, health, fiction and parenting. The library contained over 5000 titles. There were two types of library memberships, one for residents and one for non-residents. The library was the first project to reopen after Hurricane Katrina.

The Collective
The Iron Rail was run by a group of anti-police volunteers working together to present a model for a non-authoritarian structure of organizing. In addition to being a library and bookstore, the Iron Rail was also the hub of radical activism in New Orleans. It regularly featured lectures, talks, discussions and presentations by various travelers, in addition to being the meeting place for many other groups. Kimya Dawson played a benefit for Iron Rail.

See also
ABC No Rio  
Boxcar Books 
Catalyst Infoshop
Civic Media Center
Firestorm Cafe & Books 
Internationalist Books
Lucy Parsons Center
Red Emma's

References

External links
 Aboveground Zine Library
 Archived Iron Rail Book Collective website

Buildings and structures in New Orleans
Education in New Orleans
Infoshops
Libraries in Louisiana
Independent bookstores of the United States
Faubourg Marigny
Anarchist bookstores
2003 establishments in Louisiana